John G. Regan was an American football coach.  He served as the head football coach at Bentley University from 1976 to 1978, compiling a career record of 151–60–1 as a varsity coach and 12–10–2 overall.

Regan played college football at Boston University as a wide receiver on the 1956 and 1957 teams.

Head coaching record

References

Year of birth missing
2015 deaths
Bentley Falcons football coaches
Boston University Terriers football players
Sportspeople from Medford, Massachusetts